Kingston University London is a public research university located within the Royal Borough of Kingston upon Thames, in South West London, England. Its roots go back to the Kingston Technical Institute, founded in 1899. It received university status in 1992, before which the institution was known as Kingston Polytechnic.

Kingston has around 17,000 students and a turnover of £192 million. It has four campuses situated in Kingston and Roehampton. The university specialises in the arts, design, fashion, science, engineering, and business and is organised into four faculties: Kingston School of Art, Faculty of Business and Social Sciences (which combines Kingston Business School and the School of Law, Social and Behavioural Sciences), Faculty of Health, Science, Social Care and Education and Faculty of Engineering, Computing and the Environment. The Kingston Business School is CNAA MBA degree approved. In 2017, the university won The Guardian University Award for teaching excellence.  Kingston is a member of the European University Association, the Association of Commonwealth Universities and University Alliance group.

The University has been ranked in the UK's top 50 institutions by The Guardian in the last three years of the newspaper's annual rankings. In the most recent release, Kingston was rated top in London for fashion and textiles, and nursing and midwifery, while featuring in the top 10 nationally in five subjects. 

The University's Town House building, which was opened in January 2020, has picked up two prestigious awards – The 2021 Royal Institute of British Architects (RIBA) Stirling Prize, given to the best new building in the UK, and the Mies van der Rohe architecture award for the best building in the EU in 2022. 

In June 2021, Kingston launched its Future Skills campaign, highlighting the importance of skills for innovation and the vital role they play in driving a thriving UK economy. The results of their 2021 and 2022 surveys, conducted with support from YouGov and sampling more than 2,000 businesses and 1,000 students, demonstrated key attributes such as problem solving, critical thinking, communication, adaptability and creativity remain among the core skills most valued by employers.

History
Kingston was founded as Kingston Technical Institute in 1899, it offered courses in chemistry, electrical wiring, construction and nursing. In 1917 Gipsy Hill College for teacher training opened, a predecessor of Kingston University. Gipsy Hill College was created by Belle Rennie and led by an Australian named Lillian Daphne de Lissa. In 1930 the Kingston School of Art separated from the Technical Institute, later to become Kingston College of Art in 1945. In 1946 Gipsy Hill College moved to Kingston Hill. In 1951, the first Penrhyn Road campus buildings opened. Kingston was recognised as a 'Regional College of Technology' by the Ministry of Education in 1957. In 1970, the College of Technology merged with the College of Art to become Kingston Polytechnic, offering 34 major courses, of which 17 were at degree level. In 1975, Kingston merged with the Gipsy Hill College of Education, incorporating the college's faculty into Kingston's Division of Educational Studies.

Kingston was granted university status under the Further and Higher Education Act 1992. In 1993, Kingston opened the Roehampton Vale campus building and in 1995, Kingston acquired Dorich House.

Campuses and estate

Penrhyn Road

This is the main university campus located close to Kingston town centre. Students based here study: Arts and Social Sciences, Civil Engineering, Computing and Information Systems and Mathematics, Earth Sciences and Geography, Statistics, Biosciences, Pharmacy, Chemistry and Pharmaceutical Science, and Radiography. Development at this site has extended it to the Learning Resources Centre. In 2015, the Union of Kingston Students, moved into the main building. Penrhyn Road also houses the refurbished Fitness Centre.

Town House
 
Kingston University's Town House building was opened in January 2020 and is located on the Penrhyn Road campus. The six-storey building was the first by Royal Institute of British Architects (RIBA) Gold Medal-winning firm Grafton Architects in the United Kingdom and is open to students, staff and the local community.

The building work was carried out by Hertfordshire-based Willmott Dixon. It features a three-floor academic library, archive, dance studios and a studio theatre. It  incorporates a covered internal courtyard, two cafes and external balconies and walkways culminating in a rooftop garden with views across Kingston upon Thames and the River Thames.

Town House has been nominated for three awards, including in The Guardian University Awards, and a RIBA London Regional Award.

In October 2021, Town House was announced as the winner of the 25th RIBA Stirling Prize.

Kingston Hill

Kingston Hill mainly caters to Nursing (adult, child, mental health and learning disability), Education, Business, Music and Social Care. Before 1989, this campus was known as Gipsy Hill.

The Business School moved to a new building on the Kingston Hill Campus in 2012.

Knights Park
 
Located on Grange road, Knights Park campus is home to some of the students from Kingston School of Art (KSA) - architecture an art and design students. The campus is built on the northern banks of the Hogsmill River and opened in 1939.

A £29 million refurbishment of the Mill Street workshops, studios and the reception area was completed in March 2020 and includes a gallery, a social space and an art shop. The regeneration project was shortlisted for a Royal Institute of British Architects (RIBA) London Regional Award.

Roehampton Vale
The Roehampton Vale campus was opened in 1993 by Sir William Barlow, the president of the Royal Academy of Engineering. The site is located on Friars Avenue, on the outskirts of Kingston. 
This campus is purpose-built and completely dedicated to the study of engineering (aerospace, automotive, motor vehicle and mechanical engineering).

Facilities on site include a wind tunnel, engineering workshops, a flight simulator,a range of vehicles, a Learjet 25 plan, several large 3D printers, plus automotive and aeronautical learning resources.

Reg Bailey Theatre Complex 
Former church converted into the Kingston Drama students' base, the Reg Bailey has two theatres with lighting and sound equipment, three rehearsal rooms and a costume room while its annexed Surrey Club is for Dance students. The Reg Bailey has been home to such alumni members as Ben Barnes, Sam Chan, Mandy Takhar, Alphonsia Emmanuel, Jessie Cave, Laura Harling and Trevor Eve.

Tolworth Court Sports Ground
The university's 55-acre sports ground houses twelve football pitches, two rugby pitches, three cricket  squares, one American football pitch, one lacrosse pitch, two netball courts and three tennis courts.

Other locations
Additional to the four main campuses is an administration building: Hind Court on London Road which was home to the office of the Vice-Chancellor until 2018 when they moved to Holmwood House.

Furthermore, art and design studies students from Kingston School of Art are based at River House, on the High Street in Kingston town centre.

Organisation
Teaching and research are organised in four faculties.

Kingston School of Art
Kingston School of Art (KSA) was established as part of Kingston Technical Institute founded 1899. The School of Art separated from the Technical College in 1930 and left Kingston Hall Road to move to Knights Park in 1939. It became Kingston College of Art in 1945 and merged back with the Technical College to form Kingston Polytechnic in 1970. The Polytechnic later became Kingston University in 1992, under which the school was known as the Faculty of Art, Design and Architecture (FADA) until 2017 when it reverted to its historic name.
Kingston School of Art delivers undergraduate and postgraduate programmes of study across three schools:

Faculty of Business and Social Sciences
The Faculty of Business and Social Sciences combines Kingston Business School and the School of Law, Social and Behavioural Sciences.

Kingston Business School (KBS) can be traced back to the 1960s. In 1985, the CNAA approved the school's Master of Business Administration (MBA) degree and the following year KBS moved to Kingston Hill Campus. The Business School is divided into four departments:

Faculty of Health, Science, Social Care and Education
The Faculty of Health, Science, Social Care and Education was founded in August 2022 and contains courses including nursing, midwifery, social work and teacher training education. The faculty also contains life sciences and chemistry and pharmacy courses, which were previously part of Kingston's former Faculty of Science, Engineering and Computing – now the Faculty of Engineering, Computing and the Environment. 

The new Faculty of Health, Science, Social Care and Education was established after a formal partnership between Kingston University and St George's, University of London (SGUL) was mutually terminated in July 2022 after 26 years working together training the next generation of healthcare workers, social workers and teachers. The faculty is based at the University's Kingston Hill and Penrhyn Road campuses in Kingston upon Thames.

Faculty of Engineering, Computing and the Environment
The Faculty of Engineering, Computing and the Environment was founded in August 2022 and contains courses including mechanical, civil and aerospace engineering, computing, cyber security, quantity surveying and geography.  The faculty is based at the University's Penrhyn Road and Roehampton Vale campuses.

Galleries and museums
The Stanley Picker Gallery is the Faculty's exhibition space which is now used to present a variety of research-based projects, fellowships and exhibitions. In 2003, the Stanley Picker Gallery gave birth to Transitstation, which was created/curated by Stanley Picker Fellow Dagmar Glausnitzer-Smith, and former gallery curator Charles Ryder. In 2003, the Director of Foundation Studies in Art and Design, Paul Stafford, converted a run-down public convenience in Kingston town centre into the Toilet Gallery.

Kingston University runs Dorich House Museum  which houses a huge collection of sculptor Dora Gordine's work, and fine examples of Russian Imperial art and furniture. Dorich House is also used as meeting and conference venue.

Research
The Kingston School of Art runs a number of research centres:
Contemporary Art Research Centre ("CARC"), a Research Centre within the Department of Fine Art
Colour Design Research Centre
Screen Design Research Centre
Modern Interiors Research Design
Sustainable Design Research Centre
Centre for the Contemporary Visual & Material Culture
Curating Contemporary Design Research Group
Real Estate Research Group
Fashion Industry Research Centre
Fire, Explosion and Fluid Dynamics (FEFD)

Academic profile

Rankings and reputation
The Guardian placed Kingston 45th out of 128 surveyed universities. The Times/The Sunday Times Guide placed it at no. 92 (Good University Guide, 2022). In 2018, Kingston was ranked 1st out of 121 institutions for its graphic design and product design courses by The Guardian in 2017. In 2017, Kingston University won The Guardian University Award for teaching excellence. Kingston is ranked as one of the top 40 universities in the UK by The Guardian University Guide 2020, ranked in the top 250 in the world for Business & Economics by the Times Higher Education World University Rankings 2019 and ranked in the top 140 Global MBA rank according to "QS World University Rankings" (2020)

Student life

Union of Kingston Students
The Union of Kingston Students (UKS), formerly Kingston University Students' Union (KUSU), and in the 1990s KUGOS (Kingston University Guild of Students') is a charitable organisation representing the student body and aiming to provide services and activities beneficial to the student experience. It is a student union in the meaning of the term given in the Education Act 1994, and whilst independent of the university is funded by a block grant from it.

Halls of residence
The university has six halls of residence. Chancellors' and Walkden are based at the Kingston Hill campus. Middle Mill is adjacent to Knights Park campus, while Clayhill and Seething Wells are on opposite sides of Surbiton. Finally, there is Kingston Bridge House which is situated on the edge of Bushy Park at the Hampton Wick end of Kingston Bridge, London.

International partners 
The university holds a number of links with institutions from around the world to share teaching and research and facilitate staff and student exchanges. Kingston has a number of international 'Study Abroad' or 'Exchange' partner institutions.

Controversies

BMus external examiner
In 2008, the BBC obtained e-mails circulated within Kingston's School of Music, relating to the opinions of an external examiner moderating the BMus course. The messages showed that her final report caused considerable concern within the department. The examiner was persuaded to moderate her criticism following contact from a member of the university's staff. The e-mails also detailed a plan to replace her (at the end of her term) with a more experienced and broad-based external examiner, a process which Kingston stressed breaks no rules relating to the appointment of such examiners. In October 2008, Peter Williams, Chief Executive of the UK Quality Assurance Agency (QAA), presented the agency's findings to a Parliamentary Select Committee charged with investigating standards in British higher education. Following an investigation of the allegations by a former University staff member that undue pressure was applied to the School of Music's External Examiner, QAA upheld all charges of wrongdoing, as alleged.

Controversial speakers
In 2015, Prime Minister David Cameron named and shamed four British universities which gave platforms to allegedly 'extremist' speakers.

Kingston's Vice Chancellor Julius Weinberg defended his decision to allow controversial speakers in the name of free speech.

National Student Survey exaggeration
In 2008, an audio recording obtained by student media included two psychology lecturers asking students to inflate their graded opinions given as part of the National Student Survey. One member of staff was recorded as encouraging students to boost specific satisfaction scores, because "if Kingston comes down the bottom [of the league tables], then the bottom line is that nobody is going to want to employ you because they are going to think your degree is shit". In response, Vice-Chancellor Peter Scott confirmed that the recording was genuine but added that he believed that the incident was an isolated one. In July 2008, the Higher Education Funding Council of England removed the university's Department of Psychology of the Faculty of Arts and Social Sciences from the League Tables for the year as its sanction for having fraudulently manipulated the National Student Survey results.

Notable alumni

Notable faculty and staff

See also 
 Armorial of UK universities
 List of universities in the United Kingdom
 Post-1992 universities

References

External links

 
Educational institutions established in 1992
1992 establishments in England
University Alliance
Universities in London
Universities UK
Education in the Royal Borough of Kingston upon Thames